Globacom Limited, commonly known as  Glo (Global communication), is a Nigerian multinational telecommunications company founded on 29 August 2003 by Mike Adenuga. As of June 2018, the company employs more than 3,500 people worldwide.

Overview 
GLO has over 45 million subscribers (December 2018), making it the second largest network operator in Nigeria.

In 2011, GLO became the first telecommunication company to build an $800 million high-capacity fibre-optic cable known as Glo-1, a submarine cable from the United Kingdom to Nigeria.  It is the first successful submarine cable from the United Kingdom to Nigeria.

Globacom has the following strategic business units: Glo mobile, Glo Broad Access, Glo Gateway and Glo-1.

Ownership 

GLO is privately owned by the Mike Adenuga Group which also consists of Cobblestone Properties and Estates, a real estate and property development company, Conoil PLC, a petroleum marketing company, and Conoil Producing, a crude exploration and production company.

Strategic business units

Glo Mobile
Glo Mobile, a subsidiary of Globacom, is Nigeria's second largest Mobile Network Operator. In the first year of operation, it had one million subscribers in over 87 towns in Nigeria and over 120 billion Naira in revenues. Glo Mobile has now spread to other African countries, namely Benin and Ghana. Glo Mobile's subscriber base in Nigeria stood at over 45 million by December 2018.
As at November, 2020, the subscription level has hit 54 million.

Glo 1 submarine cable
GLO-1 is the first successful submarine cable from the United Kingdom to Nigeria, and GLO is the first individual African company to embark on such a project.

GLO-1 has the potential to provide high speed internet services, faster, more reliable and cheaper telecom services. Glo-1 will potentially facilitate foreign investment and employment opportunities especially to Africans.

The 9,800 km long cable originates from Bude in the UK and is laid from this origin to Alpha Beach in Lagos, where it will have its landing station. Glo-1 will also improve teleconferencing, distance learning, disaster recovery and telemedicine among several other benefits for Nigerians and the people of West Africa.

By country
In August 2003, Glo Mobile was launched in Nigeria. Glo Mobile introduced lower tariffs, pay per second billing and alongside other value added services. Although Glo Mobile was the fourth GSM operator to launch in Nigeria, within seven years of the company's operation, its subscriber base has grown to over 25 million.

In June 2008, Glo Mobile was launched in Benin. Glo Mobile showed unprecedented growth through the sale of 600,000 SIM cards in the first ten days of operation. Glo Mobile offered Per Second Billing, which charges subscribers for the exact airtime used. They also offered other value added services such as MMS (Multimedia Messaging Service), Glo Magic Plus news and information, vehicle tracking, musical ring-back tones and mobile banking.

In May 2008, GLO acquired an operating license through its Glo Mobile division in Ghana and plans to capture 30% of the current 11 million subscriber market within 18 months of launch. They plan on achieving this goal by launching with bundled voice and Internet services for Ghana and through specifically targeting ‘un-serviced’ areas outside Ghana's two major cities, Accra and Kumasi. Glo Mobile was set to launch in Ghana the first quarter of 2010. This has however been postponed to the third quarter of 2011, and again to 2012. In January 2012, Glo Ghana opened the "Reserve your number" campaign, but still without opening the network. On 8 April 2011 GLO launched the sub-marine optical fiber GLO1, one part of its maiden operation in Ghana, to usher in another major player in the Ghana telecommunication industry.

In October 2009, GLO acquired submarine cable landing rights and International Gateway Services in Côte d'Ivoire.

History
In 2005, Glo Mobile introduced the Glo Fleet Manager which is a vehicle tracking solution. Glo Fleet Manager helps transporters/fleet operators manage their fleet. They also introduced the Glo Mobile internet service which provides subscribers with access to internet sites which have been customized for mobile phone browsing.

In 2006, Glo Mobile introduced BlackBerry. GLO started the sponsorship of the Confederation of African Football African Player of the Year Award.  The company also started the sponsorship of Glo Lagos International Half Marathon.

In 2009, Glo Mobile launched Blackberry prepaid services which gives subscribers options to pay daily, weekly or monthly for the service.  Blackberry prepaid service gives subscribers free yahoo mail access and free blackberry messenger. The company also launched 3G high speed internet services through the sale of its 3G modem. Glo Mobile 3G network is available in Lagos, Abuja, Benin and Port Harcourt.

Sponsorships 
GLO sponsors sports events.

In Nigeria, GLO sponsored in 2009 the Nigerian Premier League, Nigerian National Football Teams, Nigeria Football Federation (NFF), Glo Lagos International Half Marathon, Glo People Police Marathon, Eyo Festival, Ojude Oba Festival, Eleghe Festival and the Confederation of African Football African Player of the Year Award.

In Benin, GLO sponsors the FITHEB and CAF African Player of the Year Award.

In Ghana, GLO sponsors the Glo Ghana Premier League, the Ghana National Football Teams and the CAF African Player of the Year Award.

In November 2009, GLO became an official sponsor of football club Manchester United. The sponsorship also includes young players from Benin, Ghana and Nigeria going to Manchester to train with the club.

Globacom is also the sole sponsor of African Voices on CNN. The programme's objective is to project game changers on the African continent and also promote the Globacom brand globally on CNN's platforms.

Entertainment
GLO collaborated with MTV on The Big Friday Show in 2012. This alliance made the show more interactive and gave viewers the opportunity for live appearances on the show. There was an added benefit of GLO subscribers winning the network's products every week.

In April 2013, GLO introduced the singing reality television show, the X Factor to Africa. The auditions were held in Nigeria and Ghana, with the ultimate prize being a $150,000 cash reward as well as a deal to be managed and produced by Sony Music to record an album.

References

External links
Official website

Telecommunications companies established in 2003
Multinational companies based in Lagos
Telecommunications companies of Nigeria
Nigerian brands
Nigerian companies established in 2003
Telecommunications in Nigeria